Hasanabad-e Nushabad (also Romanized as Ḩasanābād-e Nūshābād; also known as Nūshābād) is a village in Eslamiyeh Rural District, in the Central District of Rafsanjan County, Kerman Province, Iran. At the 2006 census, its population was 1,080, in 258 families.

References 

Populated places in Rafsanjan County